Samuel Heathcote  (11 February 1699 – 1775) of Hanover Square, London was a British politician who sat in the House of Commons from 1740 to 1747.

Heathcote was the fourth son of Samuel Heathcote of Hackney. His elder brother was  Sir William Heathcote. He married  Elizabeth Holworthy, daughter of Matthew Holworthy of Hackney on 3 May 1720. She died on. 6 May 1726 and he married as his second wife Frances, a French lady, in about 1729.

Heathcote was brought in as Member of Parliament for Bere Alston by his sister Anne, the widow of Sir Francis Drake, 4th Baronet, the late Member,  at a by-election on  22 February 1740.  At the 1741 British general election, Heathcote was returned unopposed for Bere Alston. He steadily supported the Administration. At the 1747 British general election he was replaced by his nephew, Sir Francis Drake, who had come of age by then. He did not stand again.

Heathcote died on 31 March 1775 leaving four sons and three daughters by his second wife.

References

 

1699 births
1775 deaths
Members of the Parliament of Great Britain for Bere Alston
British MPs 1734–1741
British MPs 1741–1747